Area codes 740 and 220 are telephone area codes in the North American Numbering Plan (NANP) for the southeastern and central parts of Ohio.  The numbering plan area (NPA) includes the cities of Athens, Belpre, Cadiz, Chillicothe, Circleville, Coshocton, Delaware, Gallipolis, Heath, Ironton, Jackson, Lancaster, Laurelville, Logan, Marietta, Marion, Mount Vernon, Nelsonville, Newark, Newcomerstown, Pataskala, Portsmouth, Rockbridge, Steubenville, Washington Court House, and Zanesville, Shadyside and the surrounding areas. It does not include the city of Columbus and rate centers in Franklin County which primarily use area code 614. Although it is Ohio's largest area code by geographic size, Southeastern Ohio is largely rural and has fewer residents overall than the rest of the state except in the areas near Columbus. 220 is the lowest-numbered area code in the system, that doesn't have a 0 or 1 in the middle.

History
Area code 740 was established on September 11, 1997; it split from area code 614 on November 8, 1997. On November 7, 2013, it was announced that the 740 area code would run out of numbers sometime in 2015. The Public Utilities Commission of Ohio chose to remedy the situation by implementing an overlay with area code 220, effective April 22, 2015. This requires all calls within the numbering plan area to be dialed using the full ten-digit telephone number.

References

External links

 List of exchanges from AreaCodeDownload.com, 740 Area Code

740
740
Telecommunications-related introductions in 1997